Lauten is a surname. Notable people with the surname include:

 Carl Lauten, American television director and yoga teacher
 Elodie Lauten (1950–2014), French-born American composer
 Rolf Andreas Lauten, Norwegian curler

See also
 Lauten Audio, American company
 Lautens